Micrelenchus tessellatus is a species of sea snail, a marine gastropod mollusk in the family Trochidae, the top snails.

Description
The shell grows to a length of 5 mm.

Distribution
This marine species is endemic to New Zealand and occurs off North, South and Stewart Island

References

 Hutton, F. W. (1873). Catalogue of the marine Mollusca of New Zealand with diagnoses of the species. Didsbury, Wellington. xx + 116 pp. 
 Powell, A.W.B. 1979: New Zealand Mollusca: Marine, Land and Freshwater Shells. Collins, Auckland 500p (p. 57)
 Spencer, H.G.; Marshall, B.A.; Maxwell, P.A.; Grant-Mackie, J.A.; Stilwell, J.D.; Willan, R.C.; Campbell, H.J.; Crampton, J.S.; Henderson, R.A.; Bradshaw, M.A.; Waterhouse, J.B.; Pojeta, J. Jr (2009). Phylum Mollusca: chitons, clams, tusk shells, snails, squids, and kin, in: Gordon, D.P. (Ed.) (2009). New Zealand inventory of biodiversity: 1. Kingdom Animalia: Radiata, Lophotrochozoa, Deuterostomia. pp. 161–254

External links
 To World Register of Marine Species
 
 Adams A. (1853 ("1851")). Contributions towards a monograph of the Trochidæ, a family of gasteropodous Mollusca. Proceedings of the Zoological Society of London. 19: 150-192
 Adams, A. & Angas, G. F. (1864). Descriptions of new species of shells, chiefly from Australia, in the collection of Mr. Angas. Proceedings of the Zoological Society of London. 1864: 35-40
 Finlay H.J. (1924). Additions to the Recent Molluscan Fauna of New Zealand. Transactions of the New Zealand Institute. 55: 517-526, pl. 52

tessellatus
Gastropods described in 1853